Iniö is a former municipality of Finland. On 1 January 2009, it was consolidated with Houtskär, Korpo, Nagu and Pargas to form the new town of Väståboland, which name from the beginning of 2012 was changed to Pargas.

It is located in the province of Western Finland and is part of the Southwest Finland region. The population density was 3.97 inhabitants per km2.

The municipality was bilingual, with majority being Swedish and minority Finnish speakers.

External links 

  – in Swedish and Finnish

Populated places disestablished in 2009
2009 disestablishments in Finland
Finnish islands in the Baltic
Former municipalities of Finland
Pargas